Catocala amestris, the three-staff underwing, is a species of Catocalini that occurs in North America. It is considered endangered and is legally protected in the state of Michigan.

Description
Like most underwings, C. amestris has a brightly colored hindwing and brownish-gray forewings, the wingspan is 1.6-1.8in (4-4.5 cm). The forewings have a blotch that strongly resembles a kidney shape, beyond that the wing has mixed wavy lines. The hindwings have two wavy black lines separating a yellow-orange coloration. The caterpillar of this species is bluish white with a yellowish coloring on the dorsum, or top side. It also has an orange band along with 7 thin black lines on its sides.

Habitat
Between June and August this moth can be seen in dry-mesic prairie lands and oak forest. Due to only having one host plant, Amorpha canescens, the moth is hard to find in even these areas.

References

Moths of North America
amestris
Moths described in 1874